Itramin tosilate (INN), or itramin tosylate (more commonly), is a vasodilator.

References 

Vasodilators
Nitrate esters